Events from the year 1728 in Ireland.

Incumbent
Monarch: George II

Events
May 6 – Disenfranchising Act, an Act of the Parliament of Ireland, one of a series of Penal Laws, prohibiting all Roman Catholics from voting, receives royal assent.

Arts and literature
Matthew Dubourg becomes Master and Composer of State Music of Dublin.

Births
August 18 – James Caulfeild, 1st Earl of Charlemont, statesman, first President of the Royal Irish Academy, president of the volunteer convention in Dublin, 1783 (d. 1799)
November 10 – Oliver Goldsmith, writer, poet and physician (d. 1774)
Nicholas Sheehy, Roman Catholic priest, opponent of the Penal Laws, executed (d. 1766)

Deaths
January 28 – Esther Johnson, friend of Jonathan Swift (b. 1681)
Rev. Caleb Threlkeld, botanist (b. 1676)

References

 
Years of the 18th century in Ireland
Ireland
1720s in Ireland